Nivelles-Baulers was a  race track in Nivelles (in French)/Nijvel (in Dutch) near Brussels, Belgium.

History
Built in 1971, the circuit hosted two rounds of the Formula One Belgian Grand Prix in 1972 and 1974 both won by Emerson Fittipaldi, during the time when the race was supposed to alternate between Walloon and Flemish circuits. Designed by Roger Caignie and John Hugenholtz to be a safe alternative to Spa, Nivelles was perhaps too safe. It had massive runoff areas, was flat and featureless, and was described by many drivers as being bland and sterile. Nivelles was not popular amongst the paying spectators since they thought that they were not close enough to the action.

The track ran into economic problems very early in its life. The organiser went bankrupt in 1974. They were however able to find enough sponsors to organise that year's Formula One race. In 1976 it was once again Nivelles's turn to organise the Belgian Grand Prix, but the track was not considered safe enough for Formula One because of the condition of the tarmac. By 1980 the circuit was deemed too dangerous for car racing, but motorcycle events continued until 1981. When the circuit licence expired on June 30, 1981, the track was finally closed for good. Until the late 1990s the pit buildings and the circuit were left abandoned, and it was possible to drive illegal laps around the track. However, in the early 21st century the track was demolished and is now a part of an industrial estate, but it is still possible to see traces of the circuit.

The fastest F1 lap at the circuit during a race was set in 1974 by Denny Hulme, who set a time of 1:11.31 in his McLaren-Ford.

Lap records
The official race lap records at the Nivelles-Baulers are listed as:

External links

Satellite picture by Google Maps
The sad story of the Nivelles-Baulers circuit

References

Formula One circuits
Belgian Grand Prix
Motorsport venues in Belgium
Defunct motorsport venues
Sports venues completed in 1972
Sports venues in Walloon Brabant
Nivelles